Xanthophyllum lineare is a tree in the family Polygalaceae. The specific epithet  is from the Latin meaning "line", referring to the linear shape of the leaves.

Description
The smooth bark is brown or blackish. The flowers are pinkish or red.

Distribution and habitat
Xanthophyllum lineare is endemic to Borneo and known only from Sabah.

References

lineare
Endemic flora of Borneo
Trees of Borneo
Flora of Sabah
Plants described in 1982